Miguel Salvador Cocco Guerrero (August 21, 1946 – May 20, 2009) was a Dominican businessman and politician.

Born in Santiago; his parents Manuel A. Cocco and Gisela Guerrero moved with him to Santo Domingo when he was at an early age. He began his studies at La Salle Catholic College in 1956, where from an early age he excelled as student academic laurels meritorio. Cocco graduated with academic laurels with a degree in Sociology from the Faculty of Economics and Social Sciences of the Autonomous University of Santo Domingo (UASD), Cocco, then worked at the institution as a teacher and researcher, where he co-founded the Center for the Study of Dominican Social Reality (CERESD).

References 
Notes

Bibliography
 

1946 births
2009 deaths
People from Santiago Province (Dominican Republic)
Descendants of Ulises Espaillat
Dominican Republic politicians
Dominican Republic people of Catalan descent
Dominican Republic people of Danish descent
Dominican Republic people of French descent
Dominican Republic people of Italian descent
Dominican Republic people of Norwegian descent
White Dominicans